Roleder is a German surname. Notable people with the surname include:

Cindy Roleder (born 1989), German hurdler
Helmut Roleder (born 1953), German football goalkeeper

See also
Rohleder
Roeder

German-language surnames